Jermaine Carter Jr. (born January 14, 1995) is an American football linebacker for the Cleveland Browns of the National Football League (NFL). He played college football at Maryland, where he led the Terrapins with at least 90 tackles per year his last three seasons.

Professional career

Carolina Panthers
Carter was drafted by the Carolina Panthers in the fifth round (161st overall) of the 2018 NFL Draft.
In his first season in the NFL in 2018, Carter played in 16 games and had six solo tackles with one for a loss and 5 tackle assists. In the first NFL game of the 2019 season, Carter had three solo tackles, one tackle assist and a blocked punt that was recovered at the five-yard line; two plays later, Carolina scored on a Christian McCaffrey 2-yard touchdown run.

Kansas City Chiefs
Carter signed with the Kansas City Chiefs on March 25, 2022. He was released on August 30, 2022.

Cleveland Browns
Carter was signed to the Cleveland Browns practice squad on September 27, 2022. He was promoted to the active roster on December 14.

References

External links

Maryland bio

1995 births
Living people
American football linebackers
Carolina Panthers players
Cleveland Browns players
Kansas City Chiefs players
Maryland Terrapins football players
People from Fort Washington, Maryland
Players of American football from Maryland
Sportspeople from the Washington metropolitan area